NGC 387 is an elliptical galaxy located in the constellation Pisces. It was discovered on December 10, 1873 by Lawrence Parsons. It was described by Dreyer as "very faint, small, round." Along with galaxies NGC 375, NGC 379, NGC 382, NGC 383, NGC 384, NGC 385, NGC 386 and NGC 388, NGC 387 forms a galaxy cluster called Arp 331.

References

External links
 

0387
18731210
Pisces (constellation)
Elliptical galaxies
003987